Chaos Days (German: Chaostage) was an annual punk gathering, often violent, held in Hanover, Germany starting in 1982 and revived in the mid-1990s.

History 
In 1982, after several punk meetings in Wuppertal, considered forerunners of Chaos Days, the first Chaos Days occurred in Hanover. The gathering was intended to protest a police plan to create a reference library of photographs of German punks.  Thereafter, "official" Chaos Days were held in 1983, 1984, and 1985.

The most well-known Chaos Days took place in August 1994, 1995 and 1996. In 1995, 2,000 punks and squatters fought with police, resulting in over 100 injured police officers and 450 arrested young people. The program had listed: "Friday 3 pm: Street fights. Saturday 11 am: Games with fire. Sunday: Glass-breaking demonstration." The result was riots and the destruction of cars and buildings. Two supermarket were looted. These "chaos days" were the main topic of TV debates and newspapers for several weeks. Popular bands like WIZO spontaneously played a show there, and Terrorgruppe wrote a now-classic song about it ("Wochenendticket", named after a train ticket that most punks used in order to get to Hanover from all across the country).

References

External links 
 

Anarcho-punk
Hanover
Squatting in Germany